The Grand Prix du Mardi Gras was an IMSA GT Championship street race held in New Orleans, Louisiana in 1991, 1992 and 1995.

The 1991 IMSA GTP/Lights race was held on June 16, 1991 using a  circuit near the Mississippi River. The winner of  81 lap race was Wayne Taylor with Geoff Brabham finishing second and Jeff Purner and Tim McAdam finishing tied for 3rd place.

On June 14, 1992, the IMSA GTP/Lights street race was moved to a  circuit around the Louisiana Superdome. The winner of  89 lap race was Juan Fangio II with Geoff Brabham and P.J. Jones finishing 2nd and 3rd.

In 1995, the Grand Prix du Mardi Gras IMSA GTS-2 street race was run on the  circuit around the Louisiana Superdome on October 8. The winner of the  29 lap race was Bill Auberlen with Kevin Buckler and Jorge Trejos finishing 2nd and 3rd. This would be the last major race in the New Orleans area until the 2015 Indy Grand Prix of Louisiana at NOLA Motorsports Park.

Lap records

The fastest official race lap records at the Grand Prix du Mardi Gras (New Orleans) are listed as:

Winners

References

IMSA GT Championship races
Motorsport competitions in New Orleans
Motorsports
Defunct motorsport venues in the United States
Motorsport venues in Louisiana